King's Highway 121, commonly referred to as Highway 121, was a provincially maintained highway in the Canadian province of Ontario that connected several communities in the cottage country region of Central Ontario on the southern edge of the Canadian Shield. Between Fenelon Falls and Minden, Highway 121 served as an alternative route to Highway 35, which was severely congested during summer weekends. From Minden, the highway branched east to Haliburton Village and thereafter followed the present route of Highway 118 to Highway 28 in Paudash.

Highway 121 was established in 1955, connecting to Highway 35 near Fenelon Falls and Minden. It was extended to Tory Hill via Haliburton Village the following year. 1956 also saw the discovery of significant uranium deposits in the Bancroft area, prompting the Department of Highways to construct a new east–west route, Highway 109.

The route remained unchanged until the mid-1990s, when government cutbacks led to a mass transferring—or downloading—of a significant portion of the provincial highway network. In 1997, Highway 121 was downloaded between its southern terminus and the community of Fell, north of Fenelon Falls, as well as from north of Kinmount to Highway 35 in Minden. The section between Fell and Kinmount as well as between Highway 35 and the eastern terminus of Highway 118 was downloaded in 1998, resulting in a common terminus with the latter. This was rectified in 2003 by renumbering the remaining length of Highway 121 as an eastern extension of Highway 118.

Route description 

Highway 121 was a  route that connected several communities through southcentral Ontario.
As it exists today, the former routing begins in the City of Kawartha Lakes at a junction with Highway 35 north of the village of Cameron. It angles northeast as Kawartha Lakes Road 121, travelling through farmland for  before entering Fenelon Falls, a town centred on a lock on the Trent–Severn Waterway.

At Northline Road, Kawartha Lakes Road 8 branches to the south, while former Highway 121 curves northeast, then north between Concession I and II of Verulam Township to Fell, at the northern boundary of the township. From here it veers east, then north between lots 18 and 19 of concession I in Somerville Township. The road winds north-east alongside the former Victoria Railway and the Burnt River to the village of the same name, which it bypasses to the southeast. At Somerville Sixth Concession (Hillside Drive, now Kawartha Lakes Road 44), the route again assumes and eastward direction. It turns north and follows the Bobcaygeon Road along the eastern boundary of Kawartha Lakes, north through Kinmount and into Haliburton County.

From the Haliburton–Kawartha Lakes boundary, the route continues north along the Bobcaygeon Road into the undulating Canadian Shield as Haliburton County Road 121 to meet with Highway 35 immediately south of the town of Minden. The two highways travel concurrently along a bypass on the eastern edge of the town. Immediately south of the Gull River crossing, the route diverges east from Highway 35 as Haliburton County Road 21. Throughout the  distance between Minden and Haliburton Village, the highway serves cottages along the northern shore of Kashagawigamog Lake.

In Haliburton, the route encounters Highway 118, which continues east along what was formerly Highway 121 until early 2003.
The route passes through a lake-dotted region to Tory Hill, where it encounters the Monck Road (formerly Highway 503), which provides a shorter route between there and Kinmount. Nearly  to the east, drivers must turn to remain on the route, as the mainline continues north into Wilberforce as former Highway 648. The highway continues east, now following the Monck Road, through the communities of Cheddar and Cardiff. At the latter, the Monck Road departs to the northeast, while the highway continues east to Paudash, where it ends at Highway 28.

History 
Highway 121 was first established in 1955, connecting to Highway 35 at both ends. This segment of the route was assumed by the Department of Highways (DHO) on May 25, 1955, the same day that Highway 35 was rerouted along the Fenelon Falls Bypass; the former route of Highway 35 into Fenelon Falls became Highway 121 and Highway 35A.
The following spring, the route was extended east to a junction with the newly designated Highway 500 in Tory Hill. A short concurrency with Highway 35 was established around the east side of Minden.

During the mid-1950s, large Uranium deposits were discovered in the hills west of Bancroft. The area experienced a boom between 1956 and 1964,
prompting the DHO to construct two new highways east from Highway 28. One of these was Highway 109, which was designated (reusing the short-lived '109' numbering formerly on Eglinton Avenue in Scarborough) then constructed over the next couple years. Highway 109 was designated on March 20, 1958, from Paudash to the Monck Road west of Cardiff.
On March 1, 1964, Highway 121 was extended east to Highway 28 at Paudash, absorbing the length of Highway 500 from Tory Hill to the Highway 109 junction, as well as the entire length of Highway 109.

As part of a series of budget cuts initiated by premier Mike Harris under his Common Sense Revolution platform in 1995, numerous highways deemed to no longer be of significance to the provincial network were decommissioned and responsibility for the routes transferred to a lower level of government, a process referred to as downloading. On April 1, 1997, sections of Highway 121 between Cameron and Fell (near Fenelon Falls) and between Kinmount and Minden were transferred to the jurisdiction of Victoria County (now the City of Kawartha Lakes) and Haliburton County.
Further downloads were performed on January 1, 1998, transferring the sections between Fell and Kinmount as well as between Minden and Haliburton Village. This resulted in Highway 118 and Highway 121 sharing a common terminus.
The remainder of the route from Haliburton to Cardiff was renumbered as part of Highway 118 on May 1, 2003

Today, the former route of Highway 121 is known by various designations: Kawartha Lakes Road 121 in Kawartha Lakes, Haliburton Highlands Road 121 in Haliburton County south of Minden, Haliburton Highlands Road 21 between Minden and Haliburton Village, and Highway 118 between Haliburton village and Cardiff.

Major intersections

References 

121